The first season of the American version of the reality television show Ex on the Beach, premiered on April 19, 2018, with a launch special airing on April 12. It featured cast members from various reality television shows and first time reality participants living together in Hawaii with their exes.

Cast

Cast duration

Table key
 = The cast member is featured in this episode
 = The cast member arrives on the beach
 = The cast member has an ex arrive on the beach
 = The cast member has two exes arrive on the beach
 = The cast member arrives on the beach and has an ex arrive during the same episode
 = The cast member leaves the beach
 = The cast member arrives on the beach and leaves during the same episode
 = The cast member does not feature in this episode

Episodes

References

External links
Official website

Ex on the Beach
2018 American television seasons